Buen día, Ramón (also titled Guten Tag, Ramón) is a 2013 Mexican-German drama film directed by Jorge Ramírez Suárez and starring Kristyan Ferrer.

Plot
The story of a young Mexican man named Ramon who lives in a small village in Durango, México. Because of a lack of opportunities and the threats from the drug lords in his village, Ramón has tried to migrate to the USA five times without success. A friend tells him to go to Wiesbaden, Germany, where he has an aunt, who is married to a German man can offer work and help. Ramón follows his friend's advice, flying to Germany only to find that his friend's aunt is no longer living at that address. Ramón has to live on the streets, begging for money and food. He runs into some kind strangers eager to help.

An old woman in particular (Ruth) sees him around town and offers to take him in at her place and has him help with odd jobs at her apartment building. Despite the language barrier, the two become good friends and Ramon is generally welcomed by the neighbors, who enjoy his help and his dance lessons. One day Ramon goes missing, and unable to find him, Ruth discovers that he had been reported to the police and has been deported back to Mexico. Ramon is reunited with his family and friends, but longs for the warmth and kindness he received in Germany. A few days later, Ramon receives a call from Ruth who has decided to wire transfer him a large amount of money.

Cast
Kristyan Ferrer as Ramon
Ingeborg Schöner as Ruth
Adriana Barraza as Esperanza
Arcelia Ramírez as Rosa
Rüdiger Evers as Karl
Hector Kotsifakis as Güero

Reception
The film has a 100% rating on Rotten Tomatoes based on 6 reviews, with an average score of 7.6/10.

Critics in Germany 
Guten Tag, Ramón was shown in multiple theaters, and was a box office success in the European country. The film was released on February 5, 2013 and was distributed in 52 German theaters. Generally, the screening of Mexican productions tends to be concentrated in one of the many film festivals that take place during the year, as Alia Lira Hartmann states: "At the Berlinale, one of the film meetings where any filmmaker wants to make his work known, the screening does not usually go beyond two presentations for a limited audience".

References

External links
 
 

2013 multilingual films
2010s Spanish-language films
2010s German-language films
2013 films
20th Century Fox films
Mexican drama films
German drama films
Mexican multilingual films
German multilingual films
2013 drama films
2010s German films
2010s Mexican films